Christian Nsengi-Biembe (born 26 February 1963) is a Congolese football manager.

Managerial career
During the 2007 Linafoot season, Nsengi-Biembe managed AS Vita Club, without success. Nsengi-Biembe subsequently managed the DR Congo under-23 team, as well as coaching in the youth system at Anderlecht. On 8 August 2019, Nsengi-Biembe was appointed manager of DR Congo, succeeding Florent Ibengé. After the national team of DR Congo failed to qualify for the 2021 Africa Cup of Nations, he was fired.

References

Living people
Cuban football managers
Democratic Republic of the Congo expatriate sportspeople in Belgium
AS Vita Club managers
R.S.C. Anderlecht non-playing staff
Democratic Republic of the Congo football managers
Democratic Republic of the Congo national football team managers
1963 births
21st-century Democratic Republic of the Congo people